The 2016–17 Brisbane Roar W-League season was the club's ninth season in the W-League, the premier competition for women's football in Australia. The team played home games at Spencer Park, A.J. Kelly Park and Suncorp Stadium.

Players

Transfers in

Transfers out

Squad statistics

Competitions

W-League

League table

Results summary

Results by round

Matches
 Click here for season fixtures.

References

External links
 Official Website

Brisbane Roar FC (A-League Women) seasons
Brisbane Roar